Maravanvayal is a village in the Pattukkottai taluk of Thanjavur district, Tamil Nadu, India.

Demographics 

As per the 2001 census, Maravanvayal had a total population of 209 with 104 males and 105 females. The sex ratio was 1010. The literacy rate was 53.67.

References 

 

Villages in Thanjavur district